Mahi Bajaj Sagar Dam is a dam across the Mahi River. It is situated 16 kilometres from Banswara town in Banswara district Rajasthan, India. The dam was constructed between 1972 and 1983 for the purposes of hydroelectric power generation and water supply. It is the longest dam and second largest dam in Rajasthan. It is named after Jamnalal Bajaj. It is the biggest multipurpose project for tribal area of Rajasthan.

Power Plant

The dam has an installed capacity of 140 MW.

See also

Kadana Dam – located downstream

References

Hydroelectric power stations in Rajasthan
Dams in Rajasthan
Tourist attractions in Banswara district
Dams completed in 1983
Energy infrastructure completed in 1989
1983 establishments in Rajasthan
20th-century architecture in India